Holly Myers (born May 27, 1955) is an American politician who served in the Washington House of Representatives from the 17th district from 1989 to 1995.

References

1955 births
Living people
Democratic Party members of the Washington House of Representatives
Politicians from Portland, Oregon
Women state legislators in Washington (state)